Hamish Watson may refer to:

 Hamish Watson (footballer) (born 1993), New Zealand footballer
 Hamish Watson (paediatrician), paediatric cardiac catheterisation
 Hamish Watson (rugby union) (born 1991), English-born Scottish rugby union player